Chennai, the Detroit of Asia has now emerged as the Electronics Manufacturing Services hub of India. It already has strong base in Automotive, IT and many other Industries.

EMS Corridor stretches from Sriperumbudur to Oragadam.

List of EMS Companies
 Moto
 Karbonn Mobiles
 Flextronics
 Sanmina-SCI
 Jabil
 Wintek
 Moser Baer
 Delphi Automotive

References

Economy of Chennai
Manufacturing in India
Electronics industry in India